Rigel Gemini is the stage name of Rigel Cable, a queer, non-binary music artist known for his songs entitled "I Can't", "It's The -- For Me", "Coffee In My Cup", and "Gorgeois". His music videos have included queer and trans entertainers, including Gia Gunn and Alyssa Edwards in "I Can't", Gia Gunn in "It's The -- For Me", Ts Madison in "Coffee In My Cup, and Plastique Tiara and Heidi N Closet in "Gorgeois". He released his first album "MELT" in 2021. His music video for "I Can't" was removed from YouTube and re-released.

Career 
Rigel Gemini is a social media content creator on Instagram and YouTube focused on fashion and LGBTQ topics, who also organizes creative events and art shows in Atlanta with his husband Cameron Lee. He is a queer opinion contributor for Adweek and has been outspoken about LGBT activism and social justice. As Rigel Cable, he works in e-commerce and analytics.

Personal life 
Rigel Gemini is of Japanese-American and European-American descent; his mother is half Japanese (hāfu), born in Kobe. He identifies as queer and uses he/they pronouns. He was born in New Hampshire and lives in Atlanta. Gemini went to Dartmouth College and graduated in 2010 and married his husband Cameron Lee in 2015.

Works 
 "I Can't"
 "Day & Night" featuring TIAAN
 "Gorgeois" featuring Ocean Kelly
"Coffee In My Cup"
"It's The -- For Me" featuring Gia Gunn

References

External links 
 
 
 

People from New Hampshire	
LGBT people from New Hampshire	
Dartmouth College alumni
Living people
1988 births
American LGBT musicians
American musicians of Japanese descent
People from Georgia (U.S. state)